The Sam White Bridge is a reinforced concrete and steel overpass beam bridge which crosses Interstate 15 in American Fork, Utah. The original bridge was named for Sam White, a former homesteader in the nearby city of Pleasant Grove. It had only  underpass clearance.

The new 354-foot, 3.82-million-pound (1.73-million-kg, 1910-short-ton, 1733-tonne) bridge was built on the side of the interstate— from its final location—in order to reduce traffic impact. It was then moved into place over a five-hour period using self-propelled modular transporters, finishing the process three hours ahead of schedule.  It is the longest two-span bridge to be moved in the Western Hemisphere, and the second longest in the world to be moved.

The Utah Department of Transportation, state and federal transportation and construction officials from around the United States, as well as some from other countries, were present to view it being moved into place. An area of a nearby business park was set aside for the public to watch the bridge being moved into place.

References

External links

 
 

Beam bridges
Bridges completed in 2011
Bridges on the Interstate Highway System
Interstate 15
Road bridges in Utah
Steel bridges in the United States
Transportation in Utah County, Utah
Buildings and structures in American Fork, Utah
2011 establishments in Utah